Max Welling (born 1968) is a Dutch computer scientist in machine learning at the University of Amsterdam. In August 2017, the university spin-off Scyfer BV, co-founded by Welling, was acquired by Qualcomm. He has since then served as a Vice President of Technology at Qualcomm Netherlands. He is also currently the Lead Scientist of the new Microsoft Research Lab in Amsterdam.

Welling received his PhD in physics with a thesis on quantum gravity under the supervision of Nobel laureate Gerard 't Hooft (1998) at the Utrecht University. He has published over 250 peer-reviewed articles in machine learning, computer vision, statistics and physics, and has most notably invented variational autoencoders (VAEs), together with Diederik P Kingma.

References 

Living people
Academic staff of the University of Amsterdam
Utrecht University alumni
Dutch computer scientists
Qualcomm people
1968 births
Machine learning researchers
Microsoft people